Dad is a nickname which may refer to:

 Dad Clark (1873-1956), American Major League Baseball player
 Dad Clarke (1865-1911), American Major League Baseball pitcher
 Dad Clarkson (1866-1911), American Major League Baseball pitcher
 Dad Hale (1880–1946), American Major League Baseball pitcher
 Dad Lytle (1862-1950), American Major League Baseball player
 William H. "Dad" Martin, photographer and successful postcard manufacturer in the early 1900s
 Dad Meek (1867-1922),  American Major League Baseball catcher
 Harry Vail (died 1928), American collegiate rowing coach
 Dad Wheatley (1882–1961), Australian middle distance runner

See also 

 
 
 Daddy (nickname)
 Papa (nickname)
 Pappy
 Pop (nickname)
 Pops (nickname)

Lists of people by nickname